Mario Tennis Aces is a 2018 tennis game developed by Camelot Software Planning and published by Nintendo for the Nintendo Switch. The game is part of the Mario Tennis series and sold over four million copies by the end of 2021, making it one of the best-selling games on the Switch.

Gameplay 
The gameplay of Mario Tennis Aces consists of playing matches of tennis with various characters from the Super Mario series. Players can pick from Mario, Luigi, Wario, Peach, Waluigi, Daisy, Rosalina, Yoshi, Donkey Kong, Bowser, Toad, Toadette, Chain Chomp, Bowser Jr., Boo, and Spike. New characters are added by participating in monthly tournaments, or are added to the roster the following month if the player does not participate. Numerous characters have been added in the game such as; Koopa Troopa in July 2018, Blooper in August 2018, Diddy Kong in September 2018, Birdo in October 2018, Koopa Paratroopa in November 2018, Petey Piranha and Shy Guy in December 2018, Luma in January 2019, Boom Boom in February 2019, Pauline in March 2019, Kamek in April 2019, Dry Bones in May 2019, Fire Piranha Plant in June 2019, and Dry Bowser in July 2019.

Similar in fashion to previous installments of the series, Aces incorporates many techniques, such as "topspins", where the ball travels parallel to the direction hit, "slices", where the ball curves to one side when hit, and "lobs", where the ball travels upwards.

Aces adds several new mechanics to the Mario Tennis series. Using the motion controls of the Joy-Con, the player is able to initiate a "zone shot", where the player can aim directly where the ball will go while the game enters a paused state. If the opponent counters the zone shot, their racket will take damage. When a racket is hit with a zone shot three times, it will break, forcing the player to forfeit the match if it is their last one. Players have multiple rackets to use each match. However, players are able to counter a zone shot without taking damage using a "block", which can be performed by hitting the ball with perfect timing.

Another new addition in Aces is "zone speed". When a player activates zone speed, the match goes into slow-motion, but their character moves at normal speed, making it so faraway shots are easier to reach. The zone shot and zone speed moves use up part of the players' energy gauge, which is filled and depleted throughout the match. To refill the gauge, the player must keep a rally going with the opponent or use the trick shot ability.

The trick shot ability enables the player to quickly travel to where the ball will land. If the trick shot succeeds, then the player's energy gauge will increase dramatically. However, it is easy to misjudge the timing and therefore is a risky move to make. Another ability available to players at the cost of their energy gauge is the special shot. To activate it, the player must have a full energy gauge. The ability unleashes an extremely powerful shot that has the power to break the opponent's racket regardless of its current damage. However, the special shot can be blocked similarly to the zone shot.

Aces also has a "simple rules" mode, where only simple shots are allowed and zone shots, zone speed, trick shots, special shots and the energy gauge are nonexistent.

The game also features an online multiplayer mode, where tournaments can be set up, as well as singular matches. Players can unlock additional outfits and characters by participating in special online Tournaments held by Nintendo. Another gameplay mode is "swing mode", where players are able to swing the Joy-Con controllers to simulate hitting the ball with a tennis racket, similar in fashion to Wii Sports and the New Play Control! version of Mario Power Tennis. In addition to regular tennis matches, the game offers a story mode similar in fashion to Mario Tennis: Power Tour.

Plot 
Wario and Waluigi are mining at the Temple of Bask when they discover a treasure chest containing Lucien, a magical racket said to be legendary to those who would possess it. The duo perceive themselves as displaying pride at matches using Lucien, and open up the treasure chest to unveil it. Just as they obtain Lucien, the racket unveils its power and shocks the duo.

The duo soon emerge at Marina Stadium, immediately following a championship match in which Mario and Peach won against Bowser and Bowser Jr. The duo attempt to offer Lucien to Mario, but Luigi snatches it up, after which it begins to take possession of him, Wario, and Waluigi, through use of its grip tape. Mario and Toad then embark on a journey to destroy Lucien and save Wario, Luigi and Waluigi, on Daisy's promise that Luigi will be brought back safely.

Mario and Toad soon arrive at the Bask Ruins, where they meet Aster, guardian of King Bask and watcher over Lucien. Aster tells the backstory of Lucien and how many years ago, King Bask stripped Lucien's power and divided it among five Power Stones hidden on the island, and years later the room fell to ruin, breaking the seal and allowing the racket to fall into new hands. Aster requests that Mario find the Power Stones to end Lucien, once and for all.

Mario obtains the first three Power Stones by defeating Petey Piranha in Piranha Plant Forest, The Mirror Queen in Mirage Mansion, and the Snow Ogre at the summit of Snowfall Mountain respectively. Mario tries to claim the Power Stones in the Savage Sea and Inferno Island, but they are claimed by Wario, Waluigi, and Luigi. Wario and Waluigi decide to settle the score at Marina Stadium; whoever wins receives all five Power Stones.

The Princesses take on Wario and Waluigi while Mario takes on Luigi, with slight power given to the Princesses and Mario by Aster, respectively. They win, allowing them to receive the Power Stones, but Bowser gets ahold of Lucien before this can happen, and makes off to the Temple of Bask with it. Mario confronts him inside the Temple and not only defeats him, but breaks Lucien causing the entire Temple to collapse. With the spirit of King Bask now able to rest in peace, Aster thanks Mario for his heroism throughout the quest.

Back outside, everyone celebrates Mario's victory in banishing Lucien and saving Luigi, Wario and Waluigi, although the latter two are shamed by Daisy for attempting to use Lucien to be the best tennis players. The gang agrees that getting stronger is better than trying to control others.

Release 
The game was announced during a Nintendo Direct presentation in January 2018. A free online tournament using a demo version of the game was held from June 1–3, 2018.

Reception 

Mario Tennis Aces has an aggregate score of 75/100 on Metacritic.

IGN felt that Mario Tennis Aces was "an extremely fun arcade tennis experience, colourful and dazzling to look at and smartly balanced in its back-and-forth play." Although praise went to its new mechanics for making the game "far more fun, well balanced and less gimmicky brand of superpowered tennis than that of its disappointing Wii U predecessor, Mario Tennis: Ultra Smash," Aces adventure mode was criticized for feeling underdeveloped and not having enough replay value (such as harder versions of challenges after completing it) or unlocks, and that the main multiplayer modes lacked court selection and local tournament functions. GameSpot felt that Mario Tennis Aces "does what this series has done best, and improves what it's rarely gotten right prior", and arguing that the adventure mode was a good way for existing players to learn the new mechanics of Aces, but that the Swing Mode had imprecise motion detection, and that the game's multiplayer modes were lacking in options, and did not display stats for opponents.

Sales
Aces sold 247,161 physical copies within its first month on sale in Japan. By March 2019, total sales had reached over 2.64 million copies, making it the best-selling Mario Tennis game. As of March 2019, it has sold 550,000 copies in Japan. The 2022 CESA Games White Papers revealed that Mario Tennis Aces had sold 4.28 million units, as of December 31, 2021.

Accolades

Notes

References

External links
 

2018 video games
Camelot Software Planning games
Mario Tennis
Video game sequels
Multiplayer and single-player video games
Multiplayer online games
Nintendo Switch-only games
Nintendo Switch games
Video games developed in Japan
Tennis in fiction
Tennis video games
D.I.C.E. Award for Sports Game of the Year winners